The Humber Amalgamated Steam Trawler Engineers and Firemen's Union was a trade union in the United Kingdom. It reached a peak membership of 1,222 in 1926. The secretary of the union in 1919 was H. Gibbons. The union had its offices in West Dock Avenue, Hull. Hull was a major centre for the British fishing industry up to the 1970s. The union merged with the Transport and General Workers' Union in 1938.

See also
 Transport and General Workers' Union
 TGWU amalgamations

References

Defunct trade unions of the United Kingdom
Fishing industry trade unions
Transport and General Workers' Union amalgamations
Trade unions disestablished in 1938
Trade unions based in the East Riding of Yorkshire